il Centro is an Italian language local daily newspaper based in Pescara, Italy.

History
il Centro was founded in 1986 and the first issue was published on 3 July. Its headquarters is in Pescara and the paper was published by Finegil Editoriale. 

The newspaper was part of Gruppo Editoriale L'Espresso. It was acquired in 1993. After a merger, the parent company is now known as GEDI Gruppo Editoriale.

il Centro has an independent political stance.

The editorial office of the paper in L'Aquila was severely damaged during the earthquake in 2009.

il Centro had a circulation of 24,265 copies in 2008. Gruppo Editoriale L'Espresso claimed a circulation of 19,041 copies for the paper in 2013. The company reported that the circulation of the paper was 17,500 copies in 2014.

References

External links
  

1986 establishments in Italy
Newspapers established in 1986
Italian-language newspapers
GEDI Gruppo Editoriale
Mass media in Pescara
Daily newspapers published in Italy